Joseph Davis Cates (August 3, 1905 – October 13, 1967) was an American Negro league shortstop in the 1930s.

A native of Madisonville, Kentucky, Cates played for the Louisville White Sox in 1931. In 28 recorded games, he posted 21 hits in 107 plate appearances. Cates died in Louisville, Kentucky in 1967 at age 62.

References

External links
 and Seamheads

1905 births
1967 deaths
Louisville White Sox players
Baseball shortstops
Baseball players from Kentucky
People from Madisonville, Kentucky
20th-century African-American sportspeople